Antonio Pio Saracino is an Italian architect, sculptor, and designer based in New York City. He has designed monuments, buildings, and modern furniture, and several of his designs are part of the permanent collections of museums such the Brooklyn Museum, the Museum of Art and Design in New York City and the Powerhouse Museum in Sydney. Saracino's work has been shown in international exhibitions and received reviews in publications such as The New York Times and Architectural Digest. His statues The Guardians: Hero and Superhero are in Bryant Park in Manhattan. Vogue named him "among the most prolific Italian designers abroad."

Biography
Saracino was born in 1976 in Apulia, in the south of Italy, and attended the La Sapienza University of Architecture in Rome, where he graduated with a master's degree in 2003. In 2004 he began collaborating with Steve Blatz, an architect based in New York. Saracino has created designs for several companies and individuals such as Eni, MTV Staying Alive Foundation, Bloomingdales, the Italian government, Matt Mitcham.

His work is in the permanent collections of museums, including the Brooklyn Museum, and has been shown in solo and group exhibitions in various countries. He has won several awards for his work and received accolades from ARTnews magazine and New Italian Blood.

The Museum of Arts and Design in New York showed work by Saracino in the 2013 exhibition Out of Hand: Materializing the Postdigital. In the same year, he was commissioned to design a public art project for Bryant Park, Manhattan, entitled The Guardians: Hero and Superhero. The project consisted of two 13-foot-high statues, one made of marble and one made of stainless steel, that depicted "legendary civic heroes". The first statue, The Guardians: Hero was inspired by Michelangelo's "David", and was created as a gift by the Italian Government and Eni to symbolize friendship between Italy and the United States.

Reception
Saracino's work has been the focus of several reviews. Vogue reviewed him positively, remarking that Saracino was "among the most prolific Italian industrial designers abroad and has been beatified by serial accolades."

Works
Saracino has designed buildings, monuments and modern furniture. A selection of his design include:

Projects
Tribeca Penthouse, New York City, 2013
Diver house, Sydney, 2010
Seed House, Upstate NY, 2007 
Art Hotel (Concept study), New York City, 2007 
MaxWax Salon, New York City, 2009
Tibi Boutique, New York City, 2006

Public art

2011: "GATE 150," Washington DC 
2012: "The Globe," Los Angeles
2013: "The Arches of Hopes," New York City
2013: "City Within," Dubai 
2013: "The Guardians: Hero and Superhero", New York City

Products
Egg Shelves, 2012
Pythagoras Bowl, 2011 
Star Chair / Armchair, 2013 
Star Coffee Table, 2013
Leaf Chair, Edition, 2011
Blossom Chair, Edition, 2010
Deer Chair, Edition, 2011  
Molecular Chair,  Edition, 2010   
Modular Chair, Edition, 2009  
Formula One Trophy, Eni, 2010-13

Permanent collections
Ray Sofa, Edition, 2010, Permanent Collection Museum of Arts and Design, New York City 
Ray Chair, Edition, 2010, Permanent Collection Powerhouse Museum, Sydney
Cervo Chair, Edition, 2010, Permanent Collection Brooklyn Museum, New York City

See also
Digital morphogenesis

References

External links

Living people
Architects from New York City
Sapienza University of Rome alumni
Year of birth missing (living people)
21st-century Italian architects
21st-century Italian sculptors
Italian emigrants to the United States